Paulina Pfiffner (1825 – 29 September 1853), was a Hungarian freedom fighter in the Hungarian Revolution of 1848.

She was the daughter of an Italian immigrant. In 1840, she ran away from home to become an actor in Budapest. In 1848, she enlisted in the Hungarian forces dressed as a man under the name Ligeti Kalman. She was promoted to officer after having distinguished herself by her bravery during the Battle of Piski.

Notes

19th-century Hungarian women
1825 births
1853 deaths
Female wartime cross-dressers
Women in 19th-century warfare
Hungarian female military personnel
Hungarian Revolution of 1848
People of the Revolutions of 1848
Women in European warfare